Daljeet Kaur (1953 – 17 November 2022) was an Indian actress known for her work in Pollywood productions. Over the course of her acting career she appeared in more than 70 films.

Born in 1953, Kaur was raised in Siliguri. She was a graduate of the Lady Shri Ram College for Women in Delhi. Kaur studied acting at the Film and Television Institute of India in Pune. She made her acting debut in the 1976 film Daaj. 

In addition to acting, she once played kabaddi and hockey at a national level. 

Kaur died 17 November 2022.

Filmography
 Daaj (1976)
 Saida Jogan (1979
 Jadd Da Gandasa (1982) 
 Putt Jattan De (1983)
 Faasle (1985)
 Yaar Gareeban Da (1987)
 Kabrastan (1988)
 Patola (1988) 
 Tunka Pyar Da (1989)
 Anakh Jattan Di (1990)
 Jatt Punjab Daa (1992)
 Singh Vs Kaur (2013)

References

External links
 

1953 births
2022 deaths
Indian actresses
Actresses in Punjabi cinema
People from Siliguri